Jacob O'Neal Latimore  (born August 10, 1996) is an American actor, singer and dancer from Milwaukee, Wisconsin. In 2016, Latimore released his debut album Connection. As an actor, he is best known for his roles in Black Nativity, The Maze Runner, Collateral Beauty,  Detroit, and The Chi. He also starred in the Netflix Original movie Candy Jar alongside Sami Gayle.

Life and career
Latimore was born in Milwaukee, Wisconsin, the son of Latitia Taylor and Jacob Latimore Sr.

Film 
Latimore has co-starred in several major films, including Black Nativity (2013), as Langston, and Ride Along (2014), as Ramon. He also appeared in the movie The Maze Runner, which was released in theaters September 19, 2014. He then starred in the drama film Collateral Beauty, which was released on December 16, 2016, and street magic drama movie Sleight, which was released on April 28, 2017. Latimore is currently starring on Showtime'''s The Chi as Emmett. In 2019, “Bilal: A New Breed of Hero” was released in which Latimore acted as a voiceover. In 2020, he co-starred in the comedy Like a Boss. In 2021, he starred in Gully.

 Music 
Latimore's first single "Best Friend" was released in 2005. In 2006, "Superstar" was released. In June 2014, he released his hit song "Heartbreak Heard Around The World" ft. T-Pain. His debut album, Connection, was released in 2016. His second effort, Connection2, the sequel to Connection, was released on April 26, 2019.

Filmography

Film

Television

Discography
Studio albums

 Mixtapes & EPs 
 I Am the Future (2009)This is Me (2012)This is Me 2 (2013) 
  Leo Season (2020) 
 TBA'' (With Trevor Jackson)

References

External links 
  (archive)
 
 

1996 births
African-American male actors
American contemporary R&B singers
American male film actors
American male television actors
Living people
Male actors from Milwaukee
RCA Records artists
21st-century African-American male singers